e.tv is a South African television channel that has distributed several original television programs, including original series, miniseries, documentaries, and films. e.tv's original productions also include continuations of canceled series from other networks, as well as licensing or co-producing content from international broadcasters for exclusive broadcast in South Africa and other African territories (through the eAfrica feed). As almost all of e.tv's original programming is multilingual, the languages used in the program are also listed (all non-English programming, including segments of unscripted programming where another language is used, is subtitled in English), is organized by its primary genre or format, and is sorted by premiere date. These are productions that have been (or are currently) shown on e.tv, including sister channels eExtra, eReality, eToonz, and eNCA, as well as their streaming service eVOD and the defunct channels eKasi+, eNolly+, Rewind, and e.tv News & Sports

Drama

Comedy

Animation

Kids and Family

Unscripted

Variety

Co-productions 
These shows have been commissioned by e.tv in cooperation with another network

Movies

Continuations 
These shows have been picked up by e.tv for additional seasons after airing previous seasons from another network.

Upcoming original programming

References 

E.tv original programming